is a three-piece rock band from Kagoshima, Japan.

Band members

Current members
 Kohei Fukunaga - lead vocal
 Kosuke Yamazaki - guitar
 Mineho Osawa - drums

Past members
 Ryosuke Korenaga - bass
 Naruna Tono - painter
 Aya Hashimoto - jewelry designer
 kari - costume designer

Discography

Albums

Studio albums

Extended plays

Singles

As lead artist

Promotional singles

Awards and nominations

References

Japanese alternative rock groups
Musical groups from Kagoshima Prefecture
Musical groups established in 2013
2013 establishments in Japan